Michael Musumeci Jr. (born July 7, 1996) is an American submission grappler and Brazilian Jiu-Jitsu black belt competitor.

A four-time World Champion and Pan American Champion in colored belts, Musumeci is a five-time IBJJF black belt World Champion (four times in Gi and once in No-Gi), and the first American to win more than one IBJJF World title at black belt. He is currently signed to ONE Championship where he is the current flyweight submission grappling champion.

Early life 
Michael Musumeci Jr. was born in Marlboro, New Jersey on July 7, 1996. Musumeci is of Italian ancestry. He began training Brazilian jiu-jitsu (BJJ) at age 4 along with his sister Tammi at Fatjo's Martial Arts Academy under coach Fernando "Cabeça". When he was 10 his family moved to Florida. While training at various academies, he met brothers Rafael and Guilherme Mendes of Art of Jiu Jitsu (AOJ) during a seminar, starting a long relationship with the brothers and their academy. Starting at juvenile blue belt, Musumeci won IBJJF world championships at every belt level. In 2014 Guilherme Mendes awarded him his brown belt right after his 2014 purple belt world title while on the podium. In 2015 aged 18, Musumeci received his black belt from Gilbert Burns.

Black belt career 
The following year Musumeci won the 2016 Pan American Championship at roosterweight followed by the World No-Gi Championship. In 2016 he switched team joining Caio Terra's association. In 2017 Musumeci won the UAEJJF World Pro at black belt in the 62 kg weight class. In 2017 he won the World Championship in the Lightfeather division. In 2018 Musumeci became World Champion for the second time. Fighting in a lower weight division he won the World Championship two more times in 2019 and 2021.

2021 
Musumeci made his Who's Number One debut on March 26, 2021, where he submitted Marcelo Cohen with an armbar from the triangle choke position. On May 28, 2021 Musumeci returned to WNO, submitting Lucas Pinheiro with a heelhook. Musumeci's third WNO match was against Edwin 'Junny' Ocasio on June 18, 2021, and Musumeci won the bout by unanimous decision. Musumeci was then invited to compete in the inaugural WNO Championships event, taking part in the tournament for the promotion's Lightweight title. Musumeci faced Gabriel Sousa in the opening round and was submitted by north-south choke, removing him from the competition. Musumeci then competed for the inaugural WNO Bantamweight title on October 20, 2021. He submitted Richard Alarcon with a leglock that has since been dubbed 'The Mikey Lock', and won the belt.

Musumeci was scheduled to make his ADCC debut at the 2022 ADCC World Championship after receiving an invite to the event. During the build-up, the promotion staged their first 'Road to ADCC' event on July 17, 2021 where Musumeci faced fellow ADCC 2022 competitor Geo Martinez, beating him 6-0 on points. After the conclusion of the match, both Martinez and his coach Eddie Bravo confronted Musumeci as they exchanged heated words on the mat. He was forced to withdraw from ADCC 2022 as a result of injury, but has since called for a rematch with Martinez regardless. The pair were originally scheduled for a rematch on March 25, 2021, but the match was postponed and did not come to fruition.

At the end of 2021, Musumeci and his sister Tammi both changed gyms and joined Pedigo Submission Fighting to train under Heath Pedigo.

2022 

Musumeci defended the WNO Bantamweight title against Estevan Martinez on January 21, 2022, winning by unanimous decision. Soon after, he signed with ONE Championship. After signing with ONE Championship, Musumeci switched gyms once again and moved to Singapore to train at Evolve MMA.

After signing with ONE Championship, Musumeci faced Masakazu Imanari in a grappling bout at ONE 156 on April 22, 2022. He submitted Imanari by the way of rear-naked choke, and won the $50,000 'Performance of the Night' bonus as a result.

Musumeci faced Cleber Sousa for the inaugural ONE Flyweight Submission Grappling World Championship on October 1, 2022, at ONE on Prime Video 2. Musumeci won the match and the belt via unanimous decision at the end of the 10 minutes.

Musumeci was scheduled to make his first title defense against Sayan Khertek on January 14, 2023, at ONE on Prime Video 6. However, Khertek forced to withdraw due to injury and was replaced by Gantumur Bayanduuren. Musumeci defeated Bayanduuren by unanimous decision and retained his title. It came to light afterward that Bayanduuren suffered several severe injuries to his leg as a result of submission attempts by Musumeci during the match.

2023
Musumeci is scheduled to make his second title defense against Osamah Almarwai at ONE Fight Night 10 on May 5, 2023.

Accomplishments 
Main Achievements (Black Belt)
 World record holder for fastest submission in an IBJJF world championship adult black belt final.
 IBJJF World Champion (2021 / 2019 / 2018/2017)
 IBJJF Pan American Champion (2016)
 IBJJF European Open Champion (2020 / 2017)
 IBJJF American National Champion (2016/2015)
 IBJJF World No-Gi Champion (2016)
 UAEJJF Abu Dhabi Pro Champion (2017)
 UAEJJF Abu Dhabi Grand Slam LA Champion (2016)
 ONE Flyweight Submission Grappling World Championship (One time; current) (1 Defense)

Main Achievements (Colored Belts)
 IBJJF World Champion (2015 brown, 2014 purple, 2013/2012 juvenile blue)
 IBJJF Pan American Champion (2015 brown, 2014 purple, 2013/2012 juvenile blue)
 IBJJF World No-Gi Champion (2011 blue juvenile)
 IBJJF Pan American NoGi Champion (2011 blue juvenile)

Career record 
{| class="wikitable sortable" style="font-size:80%; text-align:left;"
|-
| colspan=8 style="text-align:center;" | 21 Matches, 18 Wins (8 Submissions), 3 Losses (1 Submission), 0 Draws
|-
!  Result
!  style="text-align:center;"| Rec.
!  Opponent
!  Method
!  Event
!  Date
!  Location
|-
|Win
|style="text-align:center;"|19–3
| Bayanduuren Gantumur
|Decision (unanimous)
|ONE Fight Night 6
|January 14, 2023
| Bangkok, Thailand
|-
|Win
|style="text-align:center;"|18–3
| Cleber Souza
|Decision (unanimous)
|ONE on Prime Video 2
|October 1, 2022
| Kallang, Singapore
|-
|Win
|style="text-align:center;"|17–3
| Masakazu Imanari
|Submission (rear naked choke)
|ONE 156
|April 22, 2022
| Kallang, Singapore
|-
|Win
|style="text-align:center;"|16–3
| Estevan Martinez
|Decision (unanimous)
|Who's #1: Craig Jones vs. Pedro Marinho
|January 21, 2022
| Dallas, Texas
|-
|Win
|style="text-align:center;"|15–3
| Bruno Malfacine
|Decision (points)
|IBJJF World Jiu-Jitsu Championship: Finals
|December 12, 2021
| Anaheim, California
|-
|Win
|style="text-align:center;"|14–3
| Richard Alarcon
|Submission (leg lock)
|Who's #1: The Return of Gordon Ryan
|October 20, 2021
| Austin, Texas
|-
|Loss
|style="text-align:center;"|13–3
| Joao Gabriel Sousa
|Submission (north south choke)
|2021 FloGrappling WNO Championship: Day 1
|September 25, 2021
| Austin, Texas
|-
|Win
|style="text-align:center;"|13–2
| Geovanny Martinez
|Decision (points)
|Road to ADCC
|July 18, 2021
| Austin, Texas
|-
|Win
|style="text-align:center;"|12–2
| Edwin Ocasio
|Decision (unanimous)
|Who's #1: Craig vs. Ruotolo
|June 18, 2021
| Austin, Texas
|-
|Win
|style="text-align:center;"|11–2
| Lucas Pinheiro
|Submission (inside heel hook)
|Who's #1: Gordon Ryan vs. Luiz Panza
|May 28, 2021
| Austin, Texas
|-
|Win
|style="text-align:center;"|10–2
| Marcelo Cohen
|Submission (triangle armbar)
|Who's #1: Gordon Ryan vs. Vagner Rocha
|March 26, 2021
| Austin, Texas
|-
|Loss
|style="text-align:center;"|9–2
| Mahamed Aly
|Decision (points)
|rowspan=4|European Brazilian Jiu Jitsu Championship 2020
|rowspan=4|January 25, 2020
|rowspan=4| Lisbon, Portugal
|-
|Win
|style="text-align:center;"|9–1
| Francisco Jonas Andrade
|Decision (split)
|-
|Win
|style="text-align:center;"|8–1
| Diego Oliveria Batista
|Submission (straight ankle lock)
|-
|Win
|style="text-align:center;"|7–1
| Suraj Budhram
|Submission (arm-in ezekiel choke)
|-
|Win
|style="text-align:center;"|6–1
| Joseph Lee
|Submission (omoplata)
|World Jiu Jitsu Festival: Day 1
|October 5, 2019
| Long Beach, California
|-
|Win
|style="text-align:center;"|5–1
| Rodnei Barbosa
| Submission (straight ankle lock)
|rowspan=3|2019 IBJJF World Jiu-Jitsu Championship
|rowspan=3|June 2, 2019
|rowspan=3| Long Beach, California
|-
|Win
|style="text-align:center;"|4–1
| Bruno Malfacine
|Decision (Points)
|-
|Win
|style="text-align:center;"|3-1
| Koji Shibamoto
|Decision (Points)
|-
|Loss
|style="text-align:center;"|2–1
| Nobuhiro Sawada
| Decision
|Pan Jiu-Jitsu IBJJF Championship
|March 24, 2019
| Irvine, California
|-
|Win
|style="text-align:center;"|2–0
| Ary Farias
| Decision
|2018 IBJJF World Jiu-Jitsu Championship
|June 3, 2018
| Los Angeles, California
|-
|Win
|style="text-align:center;"|1–0
| João Miyao
| Decision
|2017 IBJJF World Jiu-Jitsu Championship
|June 4, 2017
| Los Angeles, California
|-
| colspan=8 style="text-align:center;" | Source
|-

Notes

References 

1996 births
American practitioners of Brazilian jiu-jitsu
People awarded a black belt in Brazilian jiu-jitsu
Living people
People from Marlboro Township, New Jersey
World Brazilian Jiu-Jitsu Championship medalists
Submission grapplers
ONE Championship champions